Norwood is an unincorporated community and census-designated place (CDP) in Charlevoix County in the U.S. state of Michigan. The population of the CDP was 144 at the 2020 census.  It is located along the shores of Lake Michigan in Norwood Township.

History

The area was settled as early as 1867 when Orvis Wood and Lucius Pearl, and Orin Adams built a dock and sawmill here.  At the time, it was part of Emmet County, as Charlevoix County was not organized in 1869.  The following year, William Harris built a hotel, and it became an important shipping location.  Harris served as the first postmaster when a post office opened on February 1, 1868.  The name Norwood was chosen due to its located in the northern woods.  The post office operated until April 30, 1913.

In 1867, the Norwood School District No. 1 was organized.  In 1869, a frame schoolhouse was built, and the current structure was built in 1890.  Due to low enrollment, the district merged with Charlevoix School District in 1957.  The structure then served as a church building.  It was purchased and restored to a museum by the Norwood Area Historic Society in 2004.  In 2017, the former schoolhouse was dedicated as a Michigan State Historic Site.

The community of Norwood was listed as a newly-organized census-designated place for the 2010 census, meaning it now has officially defined boundaries and population statistics for the first time.  Norwood uses the Charlevoix 49720 ZIP Code.

Geography

Major highways
  runs south–north near the eastern boundary of the Norwood CDP.

Demographics

Education
Norwood is served entirely by Charlevoix Public Schools to the northeast in Charlevoix.

Notable people
 Ding Darling, cartoonist born in Norwood

References

Census-designated places in Charlevoix County, Michigan
Census-designated places in Michigan
Unincorporated communities in Charlevoix County, Michigan
Unincorporated communities in Michigan
Michigan populated places on Lake Michigan
Populated places established in 1867
1867 establishments in Michigan